Constellation Energy Corporation is an energy company headquartered in Baltimore, Maryland, United States. The company provides electric power, natural gas, and energy management services. It has approximately two million customers across the continental United States.

The company was known as Constellation Energy Group, (former NYSE ticker symbol CEG) a Fortune 500 company and one of the largest electricity producers in the United States, until a merger with Exelon in 2012. When the acquisition was approved by FERC, Constellation Energy's energy supply business was re-branded as Constellation, an Exelon company. As part of the 2012 merger, Baltimore Gas and Electric, the regulated utility operated by Constellation Energy, became a regulated utility operating under Exelon Utilities. The current iteration of the company was founded in 2022 after splitting off from Exelon.

Before merging with Exelon, Constellation Energy Group operated more than 35 power plants in 11 states (mainly Maryland, Pennsylvania, New York, West Virginia, and California). Baltimore Gas and Electric created Constellation as a holding company in 1999.

History
On September 15, 2005, Constellation Energy announced a joint venture, UniStar Nuclear, with Areva to market the European Pressurized Reactor (EPR) in the United States. On December 19, 2005, FPL Group, Inc. announced the acquisition of Constellation Energy in a merger transaction valued at more than $11 billion as well as the fact that it would adopt Constellation Energy as its name for the post-merger entity. The merger was canceled on 25 October 2006.

On July 1, 2008, Constellation Energy bought uranium trading firm Nufcor International from AngloGold Ashanti and FirstRand International. A year later it was sold to Goldman Sachs.

In September 2008, after reports that Constellation Energy had exposure to Lehman Brothers following that firm's bankruptcy filing, Constellation's stock price dropped 56% in a single day. The massive drop led the New York Stock Exchange to halt trading in Constellation. The next day, as the stock fell as low as $13 a share, the company announced it was hiring Morgan Stanley and UBS to advise it on "strategic alternatives" suggesting a buyout. While French power company Electricite de France (EDF), which already owned 9.5% of Constellation's shares, bid for the company, Constellation ultimately agreed to a buyout by MidAmerican Energy, part of Berkshire Hathaway. However, on December 17, 2008, the firm canceled its merger with Berkshire Hathaway and opted to sell its nuclear energy assets to EDF.

In April 2010, Constellation Energy closed its agreement with Clipper Windpower to acquire the Criterion Wind Project in Garrett County, Maryland, and to purchase 28 Clipper Liberty 2.5-MW wind turbines for the project. Construction was completed in December 2010. In May 2010, the firm acquired two natural gas combined-cycle generation facilities in Texas from Houston-based Navasota Holdings. The $365 million transaction included the Colorado Bend Energy Center, a 550-MW facility near Wharton, Texas, and Quail Run Energy Center, a 550-MW facility near Odessa, Texas. The purchase added 1,100 MW of capacity.

On April 28, 2011, Exelon announced its intention to purchase Constellation Energy. The merger was completed on March 12, 2012.

On May 27, 2011, Constellation Energy announced its intention to purchase StarTex Power, a retail electricity provider in Houston, Texas; the purchase was completed on June 1, 2011. In 2018, the StarTex brand was discontinued and its existing customers were instead served by Constellation. In May 2011, the company acquired MXenergy, a residential and small business energy provider with approximately half a million customers. In December 2011, it announced the acquisition of ONEOK Energy Marketing Co., a natural gas company with customers in the Midwest. In 2011, it contracted to construct and operate for the Toys-R-Us distribution center in Flanders, New Jersey, what was then the largest rooftop solar array ever constructed.

In March 2014, it entered into an agreement to acquire ETC ProLiance Energy, a supplier of natural gas to customers in several states. In November 2014, it completed its acquisition of Integrys Energy Services, a competitive retail electricity and natural gas subsidiary serving customers in 22 states.

In August 2018, it began construction of a 10-megawatt solar array outside of Ocean City, Maryland. When completed, the array will provide the city with approximately 20% of its annual energy usage. In October 2018, Constellation and the Tucson Unified School District completed a project that added solar generation capability to 82 of the district's buildings and facilities. It is estimated that the project will meet 47% of the district's electricity needs.

In 2022, it became an independent company after Exelon split its utilities and power generation businesses. Former subsidiary Baltimore Gas & Electric remained part of Exelon.

Operations

Electric power

Constellation provides electric power to commercial and industrial customers. Its electricity supply business manages the sales, dispatch, and delivery of energy from Exelon's power generation portfolio to utilities, municipal co-ops, and energy retailers nationwide. , Constellation had around 360 megawatts of solar generation assets that is either in operation or under construction across the United States, including Maryland, California, Arizona, New Jersey, and Texas.  In 2011, Constellation was contracted to construct  and operate what was then the largest rooftop solar array ever constructed for the Toys-R-Us distribution center in Flanders, NJ.

Company's offsite renewables service (CORe) provides access to offsite renewable energy projects through a retail power contract. CORe combines location-specific renewable energy purchases and renewable energy certificates with a physical load-following energy supply contract.

Natural gas 
The company oversees trading, transport and storage of physical gas supply, pricing, hedging and risk management.

Constellation Technology Ventures
Constellation Technology Ventures (CTV), Constellation's venture capital fund, invests in start-up companies with emerging energy technologies. Their portfolio includes Proterra, ChargePoint and Aquion Energy

Nuclear
Constellation is a leading nuclear power plant operator in the United States with over 19,000 megawatts.

Braidwood Nuclear Generating Station (Illinois)
Byron Nuclear Generating Station (Illinois)
Calvert Cliffs Nuclear Power Plant (Maryland)
Clinton Nuclear Generating Station (Illinois)
Dresden Generating Station (Illinois)
Ginna Nuclear Generating Station (New York)
James A. FitzPatrick Nuclear Power Plant (New York)
LaSalle County Nuclear Generating Station (Illinois)
Limerick Nuclear Power Plant (Pennsylvania)
Nine Mile Point Nuclear Generating Station (New York)
Peach Bottom Atomic Power Station (Pennsylvania)
Quad Cities Nuclear Generating Station (Illinois)
Salem Nuclear Power Plant (New Jersey) (minority owner)
Three Mile Island Nuclear Generating Station (Pennsylvania) (Unit 2 owned by EnergySolutions)

Fossil
Constellation owns and operates a portfolio of fossil fuel and other sources generating more than 12,000 megawatts (MW) of power.

Chester Generating Station – Oil (Pennsylvania), which is distinct from the historic Chester Waterside Station
Colorado Bend II Energy Center – Natural gas (Texas)
Croydon Generating Station – Oil (Pennsylvania)
Delaware Generating Station – Oil (Pennsylvania)
Eddystone Generating Station – Natural gas and oil (Pennsylvania)
Everett LNG Facility – Natural gas imports (Massachusetts)
Falls Generating Station – Oil (Pennsylvania)
Framingham Generating Station – Oil (Massachusetts)
Grande Prairie Generating Station – Natural gas (Alberta, Canada)
Handley Generating Station – Natural gas (Texas)
Handsome Lake Generating Station – Natural gas (Pennsylvania)
Hillabee Generating Station – Natural gas (Alabama)
Moser Generating Station – Oil (Pennsylvania)
Mystic Generating Station – Natural gas (Massachusetts)
Perryman Generating Station – Oil and natural gas (Maryland)
Philadelphia Road Generating Station – Oil (Maryland)
Richmond Generating Station – Oil (Pennsylvania)
Schuylkill Generating Station – Oil (Pennsylvania)
Southwark Generating Station – Oil (Pennsylvania)
West Medway Generating Station I – Oil (Massachusetts)
West Medway Generating Station II – Natural gas or oil (Massachusetts)
Wolf Hollow II Generating Station – Natural gas (Texas)
Wyman Generating Station – Oil (Maine) (minority owner)

Hydro
Constellation's two hydroelectric plants generate 1,600 MW of power.

Conowingo Dam (Maryland)
Muddy Run Pumped Storage Facility (Pennsylvania)

Solar
Antelope Valley Solar Ranch One (California)

Wind
Constellation has 27 wind projects in ten states, totaling nearly 1,400 megawatts (MW).

Generation Services
Constellation Generation Solutions (CGS) is owned by Constellation. CGS functions as an industry-leading maintenance and technical services organization with an emphasis on precision and quality, structured to streamline work execution of the nuclear fleet.

Constellation PowerLabs is a wholly owned subsidiary of Constellation. Since 1911, PowerLabs has transformed over the years from being a support to the power industry, to becoming the primary calibrations and testing laboratory for Exelon. It has four individual labs strategically located from the upper-Midwest to the Northeast, enabling experienced staff in engineering, metrology, and nuclear power generation to support the urgent demands of our nation’s nuclear facilities, power grids, and critical supply chains.

Baltimore Community Involvement

Historical Archives
Constellation owns the archives of the Baltimore Gas & Electric Company and the former Consolidated Gas Light, Electric Power Company of Baltimore City and its ancient predecessor, the Gas Light Company of Baltimore. The Baltimore Gas & Electric Company's photographic collection consists of approximately 250,000 photographic prints and negatives, in more than 50,000 series The archives are held by the Baltimore Museum of Industry.

Philanthropy
Constellation ranks second in local corporate giving among Baltimore-based companies and donated $7.10 million in 2017. The company also provides grants to local schools that implement education programs promoting science and technology.

See also
Calvert Cliffs Nuclear Generating Station, on the Chesapeake Bay, Calvert County; Lusby, Maryland
Conemaugh Generating Station
Ginna Nuclear Generating Station
Keystone Generating Station
Nine Mile Point Nuclear Generating Station
Safe Harbor Dam, on the Susquehanna River, Pennsylvania

References

External links

Electric power companies of the United States
Nuclear power companies of the United States
Exelon
Companies based in Baltimore
Energy infrastructure in Maryland
American companies established in 1999
Energy companies established in 1999
Non-renewable resource companies established in 1999
1999 establishments in Maryland
2012 mergers and acquisitions
Corporate spin-offs